Nicholas Clagett (14 April 1686 – 8 December 1746) was an English bishop.

Life

Claggett was from a clerical family of Bury St Edmunds. He went up to Trinity College, Cambridge aged 16 in April 1702, graduating B.A. in 1705–6, M.A. in 1709 and D.D. in 1724.

He was appointed Archdeacon of Buckingham on 1 September 1722. After this he became Dean of Rochester on 8 February 1724, succeeding on the death of Samuel Pratt, and was elected bishop of St. David's, congé d'élire issued on 17 December 1731. He was allowed to hold in commendam the rectories of Shobrooke and of Overton in the diocese of Winchester. On 2 August 1742 he was translated, becoming Bishop of Exeter. He died on 8 Dec. 1746, and was buried at St. Margaret's, Westminster, with no epitaph.

Works

He published Articles of Enquiry for the Archdeaconry of Buckingham, 1732, and eleven sermons. One was preached before the House of Lords on the anniversary of Charles I's martyrdom, another on the consecration of Bishop White. A Persuasive to an ingenuous trial of Opinions in Religion (1685), sometimes ascribed to him, belongs rather to his father.

Family

He was son of Nicholas Clagett the Younger, minister at Bury St. Edmunds, 
and nephew of the preacher William Clagett, both sons of the Puritan Nicholas Clagett the elder.

References

Sources

1686 births
1746 deaths
Alumni of Trinity College, Cambridge
Bishops of St Davids
Bishops of Exeter
Archdeacons of Buckingham
Year of birth uncertain
Burials at St Margaret's, Westminster
Deans of Rochester
18th-century Church of England bishops
18th-century Welsh Anglican bishops
17th-century Anglican theologians
18th-century Anglican theologians